The Weyerhaeuser Arena is part of the Alberni Valley Multiplex, between the North Island College campus and the Bob Dailey Stadium in Port Alberni, British Columbia. It has twin ice sheets for hockey, figure skating and recreational skating but also has the capacity for concerts, conventions and other events.

The arena has been the home rink of the Alberni Valley Bulldogs of the BCHL since 2002, various local minor league hockey teams, and the Mt. Arrowsmith Skating Club.  Public recreational skating and recreational hockey is available throughout the season. Among other sports, the multiplex also provides a venue for lacrosse.

References

British Columbia Hockey League arenas
Indoor arenas in British Columbia
Indoor ice hockey venues in Canada
Sports venues in British Columbia
Port Alberni
Sports venues completed in 2001
2001 establishments in British Columbia
Indoor lacrosse venues in Canada